The Whole Shebang is the fourth studio album and third record label for Murfreesboro, Tennessee band Fluid Ounces.

Largely performed by Timbs himself (while still living in Los Angeles) and engineered by Murfreesboro producer Brian Carter, The Whole Shebang received typically warm critical acclaim and some of Timbs' strongest material in years. Tracks like "Fool Around," Lazy Bones," "Hung On Every Word" and "Selma Lou" showcased guitars rather than Timbs' trademark piano, while songs "Big Deal Out of Nothing" and "Make It Through" featured a more familiar Ounces sound.

Ken Coomer (formerly of Wilco) played drums on "Paperweight Machine," and Kelli Scott (formerly of Failure) played on "Destined to be Forgotten."

Track listing
 Paperweight Machine (featuring drums by Ken Coomer) (2:10)
 Crazies (4:06)
 Fool Around (3:11)
 Lazy Bones (3:47)
 Big Deal (Out Of Nothing) (3:17)
 Nobody Loves You (Like You Do) (4:52)
 Hung On Every Word (featuring bass by Mac Burrus and drums by Jason Rawlings) (3:13)
 Make It Through (4:24)
 Selma Lou (3:34)
 Tokyo Expressway (4:17)
 Destined To Be Forgotten (featuring drums by Kelli Scott and production by Matt Mahaffey) (5:30)

Credits
Seth Timbs (piano, guitar, keyboards, vocals)
Kyle Walsh (drums)
Jason Rawlings (drums)
Ken Coomer (drums)
Matt Mahaffey (keyboards, backing vocals)
Mac Burrus (bass)
Jeff Keeran (backing vocals)
Brian Carter (engineering, production)
Tom Burns (artwork)

External links 
 Review by Nashville Scene
 Review by PopMatters
 Review by Space City Rock
 Review by One Times One
 Review by Left Off the Dial
 Review by Nashville City Paper
 Review by Razorcake
 Review by MTSU Sidelines Article
 Review by Babysue

2005 albums
Fluid Ounces albums